Nerio Rodríguez Delgado (born March 4, 1971) is a former Dominican baseball player. In , he played for the St. Louis Cardinals and Cleveland Indians.

In , Rodríguez played in the Mexican League and had a 13–3 record with an ERA of 2.62, enough to earn an all-star berth and pitcher of the year honors. A rarity, Rodríguez received a decision in all 20 games he pitched in. He signed with Uni-President 7-Eleven Lions in Taiwan in 2009.

Rodríguez and his wife Ana reside in Santo Domingo, Dominican Republic, with their 3 children, two sons and one daughter.

External links

 Nerio Rodríguez MiLB.com Profile

1973 births
Living people
Acereros de Monclova players
Altoona Curve players
Akron Aeros players
Baltimore Orioles players
Buffalo Bisons (minor league) players
Cleveland Indians players
Columbus Clippers players
Dominican Republic expatriate baseball players in Canada
Dominican Republic expatriate baseball players in Japan
Dominican Republic expatriate baseball players in Mexico
Dominican Republic expatriate baseball players in Taiwan
Dominican Republic expatriate baseball players in the United States
Dominican Republic sportspeople in doping cases
Frederick Keys players
Gulf Coast White Sox players
High Desert Mavericks players
Indianapolis Indians players

Lynchburg Hillcats players
Major League Baseball players from the Dominican Republic
Major League Baseball pitchers
Memphis Redbirds players
Mexican League baseball pitchers
Nippon Professional Baseball pitchers
Norfolk Tides players
Osaka Kintetsu Buffaloes players
Pawtucket Red Sox players
Rochester Red Wings players
St. Louis Cardinals players
Toronto Blue Jays players
Trenton Thunder players
Central American and Caribbean Games gold medalists for the Dominican Republic
Competitors at the 2010 Central American and Caribbean Games
Central American and Caribbean Games medalists in baseball
Bowie Baysox players
Chinatrust Whales players
Diablos Rojos del México players
Hickory Crawdads players
La New Bears players
Leones del Escogido players
Naranjeros de Hermosillo players
Prince William Cannons players
South Bend Silver Hawks players
Syracuse SkyChiefs players
Toros del Este players
Uni-President 7-Eleven Lions players
People from Baní